Rudy Rahme (born October 1967) is a Lebanese sculptor, painter and poet.

Education
He was born in October 1967 in Bsharri, Lebanon and attended Collège Saint Joseph – Antoura in Keserwan District and then the Lebanese Academy of Fine Arts. He then specialized in fresco and sculpture at the Academia Spinelli in Florence and later he studied at the Fonderie Coubertin in Paris.

Work 

 He has finished building parts of the Maria Goretti Chapel in Miziara, Lebanon in memory of Raya Chidiac.
 The Walking Rock infinity
 The Dream
 Jibran Khalil Jibran bust
 Lamartine square
 The Walking Rock Series
 The Balance Series
 The Dancing Series
 The Religious Series
 The Bust Series
 Al Tajalli
 Gebran k Gebran
 Said Akl
 The Last Supper
 The Raft

Exhibitions
2020 - Australia - Sydney - "Rejuvenate" AAD Gallery 
2019 - Lebanon - Beirut - The Garden Show 16th
2018 - Lebanon - Beirut - Artspace Hamra
2017 - UAE - Abu Dhabi - Le Royal Meridien 
2016 - Italy - Imperia - the International photo exhibition of Contemporary Art
2016 - UK - London - Monteoliveto Gallery : Cities of Europe /London Calling
2016 - Belgium - Bruxelles - Salon international d'art contemporain
2016 - France - Paris - Light and Transparencies - Galerie Etienne de Causans
2015 - US - Miami - Miami River Art Fair 2015
2015 - Singapore - Singapore - WTECA
2012 - Lebanon - Beirut - Tawazon Robert Mouawad Private Museum 
2011 - Lebanon - Beirut - The Garden Show

References

Lebanese sculptors
1967 births
Living people
People from Bsharri
Lebanese contemporary artists